Follow Your Heart is a 1996 Italian romance drama film written and directed by Cristina Comencini. It is based on the novel with the same name by Susanna Tamaro. 

For her performance Virna Lisi won a Globo d'oro and a Nastro d'Argento for best actress.

Cast  
Virna Lisi as Olga 
Margherita Buy as  Young Olga  
Galatea Ranzi as Ilaria
Massimo Ghini as Augusto
Tchéky Karyo as Ernesto
Valentina Chico as Marta
Luigi Diberti

References

External links

1996 films
1996 romantic drama films
Italian romantic drama films
Films directed by Cristina Comencini
Films set in Trieste
Films based on Italian novels
1990s Italian films